Under the Volcano is a 1984 American drama film directed by John Huston and starring Albert Finney, Jacqueline Bisset, and Anthony Andrews, based on Malcolm Lowry's semi-autobiographical 1947 novel. The film follows the last 24 hours in the life of Geoffrey Firmin (Finney), an alcoholic British former consul in the small Mexican town of Quauhnahuac on the Day of the Dead in 1938.

The film premiered at the 1984 Cannes Film Festival, where it was nominated for the Palme d'Or. Under the Volcano received Oscar nominations for Best Actor in a Leading Role for Finney's performance and Best Original Score for Alex North’s score, along with Golden Globe nominations for Best Actor – Motion Picture Drama (Finney) and Best Supporting Actress – Motion Picture (Bisset).

Plot 
In 1938, Geoffrey Firmin is an alcoholic former British consul to Mexico, despondent from the yearlong absence of his wife Yvonne. He spends his days drinking and awaiting letters from her that never arrive, save a divorce notice signed by her lawyer. On the Day of the Dead, he wanders the streets of Quauhnahuac in a stupor, observing the morbid festivities and crashing a Red Cross charity ball.

The following day, Yvonne returns. Their initial reunion is terse, Yvonne claims to have sent him letters and expresses the desire to stay with him, even after the divorce. He resolves to quit drinking, but his newfound sobriety is short-lived. His half-brother Hugh, a war correspondent, arrives and tells Yvonne that a minor injury from covering the Spanish Civil War has brought him back to Mexico. Yvonne confides in him about her husband's alcoholism; it's gotten worse but she wants the two to reconcile. When Geoffrey suggests they go on a day trip to a local carnival, Hugh tries to leave to ease the tension, but Geoffrey insists he stay.

As they walk to the theater, Yvonne stops to admire the volcano on the edge of the village and Geoffrey suggests they climb it later. After running into his physician friend Dr. Vigil, Geoffrey leaves Yvonne with him at the carnival as he goes out to get a drink, confiding in an old drinking acquaintance. On the bus ride to the volcano, Geoffrey witnesses an Indio die in an apparent riding accident, and a Sinarquista loots money from the corpse.

Yvonne, Geoffrey and Hugh stop for lunch at a mountain café overlooking a bullfighting ring, where Hugh reminisces about the fallen colleagues he left in Spain. Hugh grabs a red cape and makes his way to the ring where he jousts with the bull. The crowd is jubilant and hoists Hugh in the air. Caught up in the swell of emotion, Yvonne suggests to her husband that they give their relationship a fresh start in a new city.

Geoffrey agrees and describes an idyllic retirement, living with Eskimos. Geoffrey pointedly adds that when Hugh visits, he will practice the Eskimo custom of sharing his wife. Ignoring her pained look, Geoffrey lashes out about a past affair between Yvonne and Hugh and then stalks off. Hugh fears that Geoffrey will not let them forget about their affair even though it is over. Through her tears, Yvonne searches for her husband, but Geoffrey boards a bus before she can find him.

Geoffrey walks into a brothel tucked in the side of a mountain, where a pimp pretends to recognize him and buys him drinks. Meanwhile, the owner of a bird that has just won a cockfight walks in and hands Geoffrey a stack of Yvonne's lost letters. In a daze, Geoffrey reads Yvonne's letters, which reveal that she is sorry for the affair and wants a second chance. Aloud, he confesses that he cannot forgive her. The pimp sends one of his girls to seduce Geoffrey and she takes him into a back room. Yvonne and Hugh arrive at the brothel, but the pimp tells them that Geoffrey is with a girl. Distraught, Yvonne leaves in tears.

Sometime later, Geoffrey stumbles out of the brothel but the rain discourages him and he returns. A group of men claiming to be police officials confront him, first accusing him of theft before taking his money and demanding his passport. The Sinarquista from earlier (who’s been tailing Geoffrey) confides with them. They taunt him with antisemitic slurs and take his letters. Geoffrey grabs a machete and a fight breaks out, accusing the men of conspiring with the Sinarquista to kill the Indio and take his money, before drunkenly ordering they “stop sleeping with [his] wife.” They shoot him dead.

Yvonne runs back to the brothel at the sound of gunshots, but a skittish horse knocks her down and kills her. The assassins kick Geoffrey's body down a ravine, while Hugh cradles Yvonne's lifeless body in the rain.

Cast

 Albert Finney as Geoffrey Firmin
 Jacqueline Bisset as Yvonne Firmin
 Anthony Andrews as Hugh Firmin
 Ignacio López Tarso as Dr. Vigil
 Katy Jurado as Señora Gregoria
 James Villiers as Brit
 Dawson Bray as Quincey
 Carlos Riquelme as Bustamante
 José René Ruiz as the Dwarf
 Emilio Fernández as Diosdado Brell
 Jim McCarthy as Gringo in Brothel
 Hugo Stiglitz as Sinarquista
 Günter Meisner as Herr Krausberg
 Araceli Ladewuen Castelun as Maria
 Eleazar Garcia Jr., Salvador Sánchez, and Sergio Calderón as the Chiefs

Production

Development 
In the late 1950s, Under the Volcano author Malcolm Lowry adapted his novel into a screenplay and attempted to interest Metro-Goldwyn-Mayer to produce it after being hired to adapt F. Scott Fitzgerald's Tender Is the Night. The studio passed and Lowry died in 1957. Actor Zachary Scott optioned the novel in 1962, but after he passed his widow sold the rights to brothers Robert and Raymond Hakim.

The Hakims spent $400,000 and began hiring talent, including director Alan Bridges and actors Richard Burton and Richard Chamberlain, and scouting filming locations in Almería, Spain, when Lowry's widow Marjorie determined that she had been excluded from creative consulting as stipulated in her contract, and filed a lawsuit, withdrawing the brothers’ film rights. Several prominent directors, including Jules Dassin, Ken Russell, Joseph Losey, Jerzy Skolimowski, and Luis Buñuel all expressed interest in helming the project but all passed.

Producer Wieland Schulz-Keil, a longtime admirer of Lowry's novel, bought the film rights in early 1982 and approached director John Huston on the set of Annie. The novel had long been considered impossible to film because its characters express themselves through considerable “internal dialogues.” Huston had been interested in adapting the novel for more than thirty years and had rejected more than twenty potential screenplays.

Guy Gallo, a playwright who had never written a screenplay before, had penned two papers on Malcolm Lowry as a Yale University graduate student, and was inspired to write a speculative screenplay. He received additional encouragement from Paul Bluhdorn, a friend from his undergraduate days at Harvard University, who was now a production executive at Paramount Pictures, and the son of Charles Bluhdorn, former head of Gulf & Western, then parent company of Paramount. As events unfolded, it was the producing team of Schulz-Keil and Moritz Borman who delivered Gallo's script to Huston.

Encouraged by the economy of Gallo's writing, in July 1982 Huston teamed with the younger writer in for two weeks, during which the men revised the screenplay scene by scene. Later, they moved to Huston's home in Puerto Vallarta, for extensive line-by-line revisions. According to Gallo, the two spent five months working on the script. The intention of the collaborators was to look for ways to simplify the characters, retain sympathy for the protagonist, replace internal monologues with action, and compress the story into a twenty-four hour timeframe. To date, it is Gallo's only produced screenplay.

Casting 
Albert Finney was cast in the lead role of Geoffrey Firmin, Jacqueline Bisset as his wife Yvonne, and Anthony Andrews as his half-brother Hugh. Firmin's friend Dr. Vigil was played by Ignacio López Tarso, an actor lesser known to English-speaking audiences but highly recognized by Mexican ones as one of the top stars of the Golden Age of Mexican cinema, winning the Ariel Award for Best Actor in 1973 for the Roberto Gavaldón film Rosa Blanca. The supporting cast includes several prominent Mexican filmmaking personalities, including director and occasional actor Emilio Fernández, cult film icon Hugo Stiglitz, and veteran actress Katy Jurado.

Filming 

Principal photography began on August 8, 1983 in the village of Yautepec de Zaragoza, a short car ride from Cuernavaca. Huston filmed most of the scenes in sequence, due to the destructive descent of the lead character, Geoffrey.

Huston chose Yautepec to double for Cuernavaca because its 18th-century architecture had the right feel and could be filmed without additional construction. The town had a long cinematic legacy, had been previously used as a locale in The Magnificent Seven (1960), and some 70 films of the Golden Age of Mexican cinema.

The town's central square was used to film the Day of the Dead festivities, and a local hotel was given murals, new doors, and lamps to create the Bella Vista Hotel. A residence known as “the Netzahualcoyotl House” in the older section of Cuernavaca that was once part of an old convent was used as Geoffrey Firmin's home, while the Red Cross ball was filmed at Cocoyoc, a resort area with a storied history, having once been conquistador Hernán Cortés’s private estate, a Dominican monastery, and a 16th century sugar mill that was destroyed by Emiliano Zapata in 1916 during the Mexican Revolution. Later, the property was converted into a resort. The dining room at Cocoyoc was used to film interiors of the Bella Vista Hotel.

The Hacienda de San Jose Vista Hermosa, Cortez’s summer palace on the shores of Lake Tequesquitengo, was where the production built a bullring and filmed bullfight sequences. The production chose a site located just outside the village of Metepec to construct El Farolito, a brothel. An actual El Farolito existed in the “red light district of old Cuernavaca,” but it was rejected because of its dilapidated state and the physical surroundings did not match its description in the book.

The shooting schedule, running from late summer to early fall 1983, prevented production designer Gunther Gerzso from acquiring African marigolds used during the Day of the Dead because the flowers do not bloom naturally until late October or early November. Instead, Gerzso used 30,000 paper marigolds combined with hothouse-grown marigolds and mubes, a white flower, for the holiday sequences.

Reception
The film was entered into the 1984 Cannes Film Festival, where it was nominated for the Palme d'Or.

Upon general release, it received generally positive reviews from critics. Reviewing in The New York Times, Janet Maslin had much praise for Finney's performance. Charles Champlin of the Los Angeles Times praised the film for being “vigorous” and “confident." Richard Schickel’s review in Time magazine stated that Huston’s “unselfconscious and objective” style of filmmaking brought clarity to Lowry's story, and praised Albert Finney's acting for drawing viewers into a difficult plot. Merrill Shindler for Los Angeles magazine agreed that Finney turned in a strong, nuanced performance, but lavished his greatest praise for Huston's storytelling and his ability to capture “the dreamworld of Mexican life”.

A negative review from David Denby in New York magazine article labeled the film “a failure” because Huston had not been able to translate the thoughts of tragic hero, Geoffrey Firmin, into a satisfying cinematic story. Denby found Finney's performance technically brilliant, but the script only captured a fraction of the symbolism and interior thoughts of Lowry's novel. In a review for Commonweal, Foster Hirsch described Lowry's book as “a Mount Everest that filmmakers have wanted to scale.”

Awards and nominations
The film was enthusiastically received, and was nominated for several awards.

Academy Awards 

 Nominated - Best Actor (Albert Finney)
 Nominated - Best Original Score (Alex North)

Golden Globe Awards 

 Nominated - Best Actor – Motion Picture Drama (Albert Finney)
 Nominated - Best Supporting Actress – Motion Picture (Jacqueline Bisset)

Cannes Film Festival 

 Nominated - Palme d'Or (John Huston)

Other awards

Related works
Huston's drama has sometimes been shown in tandem with an earlier documentary film: Volcano: An Inquiry Into the Life and Death of Malcolm Lowry (1976) is a National Film Board of Canada feature-length documentary produced by Donald Brittain and Robert A. Duncan and directed by Brittain and John Kramer. It opens with the inquest into Lowry's "death by misadventure," and then moves back in time to trace the writer's life. Selections from Lowry's novel are read by Richard Burton amid images shot in Mexico, the United States, Canada and England.

There are two documentaries about the making of the Huston film: Gary Conklin's 56-minute Notes from Under the Volcano and the 82-minute Observations Under the Volcano, directed by Christian Blackwood.

See also
 List of American films of 1984

References

External links
 
 
 
 
Under the Volcano: Before the Stillness an essay by Christian Viviani at the Criterion Collection

1984 films
1984 drama films
American drama films
1980s English-language films
Films scored by Alex North
Films based on British novels
Films directed by John Huston
Films set in Mexico
Films shot in Mexico
Films about alcoholism
Estudios Churubusco films
Day of the Dead films
Cockfighting in film
1980s American films